Peter Macdissi (Arabic: بيتر مقدسي ; born May 14, 1974 in Beirut, Lebanon) is a Lebanese actor and producer. His filmography consists mostly of television work, most notably playing recurring character Olivier Castro-Staal on Alan Ball's HBO series Six Feet Under. In 2007, he appeared in Towelhead, a feature film written and directed by Ball, who is also his partner. Along with Ball, he is one of the executive producers of the Cinemax series Banshee.

Filmography

References

External links

http://www.hbo.com/sixfeetunder/cast/actors/peter_macdissi.shtml - at the HBO official website.

20th-century Lebanese male actors
Living people
Lebanese male actors
1974 births
21st-century Lebanese male actors
Lebanese male television actors
Gay actors
Lebanese LGBT people
Lebanese expatriates in the United States